Stored energy may refer to:

Energy storage, stored energy in any form, including chemical, gravitational and electrical energy
Potential energy, energy stored in a system of forcefully interacting physical entities